Malé Trakany is a village and municipality in the Trebišov District in the Košice Region of south-eastern Slovakia.

History
In historical records the village was first mentioned in 1332.

Geography
The village lies at an altitude of 111 metres and covers an area of 11.014 km².
It has a population of about 1135 people.

Ethnicity
The village is about 88% Hungarian and about 7% Slovak.

Facilities
The village has a public library and a football pitch.

External links

 https://www.webcitation.org/5QjNYnAux?url=http://www.statistics.sk/mosmis/eng/run.html

Villages and municipalities in Trebišov District
Hungarian communities in Slovakia